The men's 4 × 400 metres relay at the 1991 IAAF World Indoor Championships was held on 8 and 10 March. It was the first time that this event was contested at the World Indoor Championships.

Medalists

* Runners who participated in the heats only and received medals.

Results

Heats
First 2 teams of each heat (Q) and the next 2 fastest (q) qualified for the final.

Final

References

Relay
4 × 400 metres relay at the World Athletics Indoor Championships